Laga (Scottish Gaelic: Làga) is a hamlet on the north shore of Loch Sunart near Acharacle, in Lochaber, in the Highlands of Scotland and is in the council area of Highland.

References

Populated places in Lochaber
Ardnamurchan